My Turn is the eleventh studio album released by American country music artist Doug Stone. It is also his second album for Lofton Creek Records. The album produced the singles "Nice Problem" and "She Always Get What She Wants", neither of which charted on the Billboard country charts. The third single, "Don't Tell Mama", was previously recorded by Ty Herndon on his 1996 album Living in a Moment and Gary Allan on his 1999 album Smoke Rings in the Dark. and Frankie Ballard on his 2014 album Sunshine & Whiskey.

Track listing
"We're All About That" (Terry Clayton, Jeff Jones, Rusty VanSickle) – 3:28
"Dancin' on Glass" (Charles Jeryl Robinson, Jeff Lysyczyn) – 3:47
"Ain't That Just Like a Woman" (Clayton, Jones, VanSickle) – 3:47
"Don't Tell Mama" (William Brock, Jerry Laseter, Kim Williams) – 3:49
"Nice Problem" (Williams, Tim Johnson) – 3:11
"The Right Side of Lonesome" (Doug Stone) – 3:40
"The Hard Way" (Clayton, Jones, VanSickle) – 3:49
"She Always Gets What She Wants" (Clayton, Jones, VanSickle) – 3:21
"That's How We Roll" (Clayton, Jones, VanSickle) – 3:15
"To a Better Place" (Lysyczyn) – 4:22
"You Were Never Mine to Lose" (Stone, Williams, Ron Harbin) – 3:50

Personnel
 Jim "Moose" Brown - keyboards
 Dan Dugmore - steel guitar
 Rob Hajacos - fiddle
 Owen Hale - drums
 Wes Hightower - background vocals
 Mark Hill - bass guitar
 Julian King - percussion
 B. James Lowry - acoustic guitar
 Brent Rowan - banjo, electric guitar
 Doug Stone - lead vocals

References

2007 albums
Lofton Creek Records albums
Doug Stone albums